Vulytsia Pushkinska is a street in the downtown of Odesa, Ukraine. The street is named after Russian poet Alexander Pushkin, who lived on the street. The street starts from the Dumska Square and finishes at the crossing with the Panteleymonivska Street. The street was founded in 1827.

The street was founded as Italian Street (vulytsia Italiiska). It was named after Pushkin on June 25, 1880, and the street saved the name until now. Although Pushkin lived in several different buildings at different times, the Museum of Pushkin (the branch of the Odesa Literature Museum) was organized at Pushkinska Street 13. The statue of Pushkin was founded at the front of the building dedicating to the 200th-year jubilee of his birthday.

Many famous architecture monuments are located on the street; among them are Abazy Palace (now the Odesa Museum of Western and Eastern Art), the New Burse Building (now the Odesa Philharmonic Theater), and the Bristol Hotel.

Sources 
 Одесса от А до Я. Пушкинская улица 
 Ю. Парамонов. Пушкинская улица. Часть І 
 Ю. Парамонов. Пушкинская улица. Часть ІІ 

 
Streets in Odesa